Felix Hoffmann (born 11 July 1989) is a German professional basketball player for s.Oliver Würzburg of the German League Basketball Bundesliga (BBL).

During the 2014-15 season, he played for the Oettinger Rockets Gotha.

References

External links
Team Profile

Eurobasket.com Profile

1989 births
Living people
German men's basketball players
Sportspeople from Würzburg
Rockets (basketball club) players
S.Oliver Würzburg players
Small forwards
21st-century German people